Bankat (also Romanized as Bānḵat; also known as Shamshīrābād) is a village in Jaber-e Ansar Rural District, in the Central District of Abdanan County, Ilam Province, Iran. At the 2006 census, its population was 297, in 59 families. The village is populated by Kurds.

References 

Populated places in Abdanan County
Kurdish settlements in Ilam Province